Laotian women have long been active participants in their nation's society, involved in politics, driving social transformation and development, becoming active in the world of business and serving as nurses and food producers for the military. Due to modernization and rural uprooting, Lao women have begun to embrace lifestyles that are foreign to traditional Laotian ideals.

Legal status

Under the Constitution of Laos, Lao women are legally equal to Lao men.  They have the right to vote and to inherit property.  In practice, the roles and status of women in Lao society often depend on ethnic affiliation.  In some cases, as in the status of Lao Loum women, the youngest daughter is often assigned the task of caring for elderly parents in return for inheritance benefits like land and business.

After receiving her inheritance, the daughter does not obtain direct control over the land or business, as her husband possesses executive power over such matters.  Other women from different ethnic groups do not inherit anything.  In 1993, the government of Lao established a program of land surveying and titling which was nominally more beneficial to female landholders. National legislation declaring Lao men and women as "equally entitled to hold property" was also promulgated, including the Family Law proclaiming that "any property purchased during marriage is regarded as joint property", and that the "land owned by a woman prior to her marriage remains her individual property, as does any land she inherits from her parents”.

Workforce
Many rural Lao women undertake a variety of semi-formal roles in their communities, including handicrafts, commerce, public health, and education, in addition to their traditional roles as homemakers and the caretakers of children.  In the cities and at the government level, Lao women are underrepresented, particularly in high-level positions. In terms of wages, women typically receive lower salaries than men.

Religion
In connection with Lao Buddhism and traditional beliefs, many Lao women are taught that they can only attain nirvana after they have been reborn as men.

Education and training

Fewer Laotian girls enroll in schools than boys.  After World War II, many women, such as the silk weavers of the Bai Hai population, became increasingly engaged in unskilled manual labour.  Despite being less literate and educated than men on average (63% of Lao females can read and write, compared to 83% of males), Lao women increasingly became the primary wage earners of their family units, especially in rural areas.

In recent decades, Lao women have furthermore benefited from microfinancing programs offered by organizations such as the Social Economic Developers Association (SEDA). In such programs, women receive training in establishing businesses, business management, procurement of materials, mass production, price negotiation for products, financial management, marketing strategies, writing skills, business planning, and decision-making. This is intended to assist women in becoming empowered and obtaining "financial stability".

Another organization involved in women's education is the Lao Disabled Women's Development Centre, an institution that trains handicapped Lao women. The Lao Disabled Women's Development Centre was established by Chanhpheng Sivila, and functioned primarily as a series of workshops before expanding in 2002.  Another similar group focusing on the rights, empowerment, and health of Lao women is the Committee for Women's Advancement of the province of Sayaboury.

Politics

The women of Lao obtained the right to vote and to be elected in 1958. They remain underrepresented in government at both local and national levels.

In recent decades women have made notable inroads into politics. In 1997, Onechanh Thammavong became one of the vice-presidents of the National Assembly of Laos. In March 2011, the National Assembly provided a seminar for forty-seven female candidates in advance of the 7th Lao general elections in April 2011, in order to instil the “significant duties of the national legislature body” in the women.

Marriage
In Lao society, women who divorce their husbands are traditionally stigmatised, often finding it difficult to find another spouse.

Prostitution and trafficking
As with many of the poorer states of South-East Asia, human trafficking and prostitution are serious issues for Lao women.

See also
Culture of Laos
Hmong women and childbirth practices
Peopling of Laos
Laos women's national football team

References

Further reading
Women and Development in Laos
National Union of Lao Women. Status of Women: Laos, Social and Human Sciences in Asia and the Pacific, UNESCO Principal Regional Office for Asia and the Pacific, Bangkok,1989
Strengthening the Lao Women's Union and Preparing for a National Women's Machinery, UNIFEM East and Southease Asia Region
Tinker, Irene and Gale Summerfield. Introduction:Women’s Changing Rights to House and Land in Vietnam, Laos, and China, Lynne Rienner Publishers, 1999, 305 pages, 
A UN body expresses concern regarding women rights in Laos, 15 February 2005

External links

Lao Women's Union

 
Society of Laos
Laos